Todor Gochev (Bulgarian: Тодор Гочев; born 15 April 1993) is a Bulgarian footballer who plays as a defender.

Career

Vitosha Bistritsa
On 9 July 2017 Gochev signed with Bulgarian First League debutant Vitosha Bistritsa. He made his debut for the team on 22 July 2017 in match against the other debutant in First League - Etar Veliko Tarnovo.

References

External links
 

1993 births
Living people
Sportspeople from Burgas
Bulgarian footballers
Association football defenders
FC Montana players
Neftochimic Burgas players
FC Vitosha Bistritsa players
FC Hebar Pazardzhik players
First Professional Football League (Bulgaria) players